Jennifer Vanasco is an American journalist at WNYC public radio in New York, where she's an editor in the newsroom and writes about culture, theater and New York news. She created and wrote the Minority Reports column for Columbia Journalism Review, is a former syndicated columnist for the gay press, and was the editor in chief of the defunct 365gay.com and a theater critic for the Chicago Reader.

Biography
Jennifer Vanasco grew up in Garden City, New York and attended Wellesley College, where she graduated cum laude in 1994 with a B.A. in Philosophy. After graduating, Vanasco was associate editor at the gay paper Windy City Times in Chicago, worked as a writer for the University of Chicago, and eventually became a freelance writer and journalism teacher. She published work in the Chicago Tribune, the Advocate, the Chicago Reader, the Progressive Media Service, TimeOut Chicago and the now defunct Girlfriends magazine. Vanasco has written for The Village Voice, Fodor's Travel Guides, Sherman's Travel and over a dozen gay publications.

She was the editor in chief of 365gay.com and blogs for the Huffington Post. She is a member of the Independent Gay Forum. Her column has been running weekly since its debut in Windy City Times in 1996 (it now runs in the Chicago Free Press) and won three Peter Lisagor Awards for opinion writing from the Society of Professional Journalists' Chicago Headline Club.

Vanasco lives in Washington Heights, Manhattan with her son. She writes about travel, the arts, and social and political issues relevant to gays, lesbians, bisexuals and transgender people, including gay marriage, gays in the military, and gay social life.

She is married to Late Night with Seth Meyers writer Jenny Hagel.

Published works
 The Glamour Factor and the Fiji Effect, Reading the 'L' Word: Outing Contemporary Television, I.B. Tauris Press, London, 2006
May 16, I Do, I Don't: Queers on Marriage, Suspect Thoughts Press, San Francisco, 2004
Grand Haven & Holland; South Haven & Saugatuck/Douglas, Where to Weekend Around Chicago, Fodor's, 2004

References

External links
 Vanasco's homepage
 Vanasco's page on the Independent Gay Forum
 365gay.com

American columnists
Living people
1971 births
Wellesley College alumni
People from Long Island
Chicago Reader people
American LGBT journalists
21st-century American journalists